Diospyros walkeri is a tree in the Ebony family, endemic to Sri Lanka.

External links
 http://www.mpnet.iora-rcstt.org/node/2836
 http://indiabiodiversity.org/species/show/265572

walkeri
Flora of Sri Lanka